The Duncan House, or Harry C. Duncan House, is a historic home in Tavares, Florida, United States. It is located at 426 Lake Dora Drive. On August 8, 1997, it was added to the U.S. National Register of Historic Places. The home is notable as an example of the Colonial Revival style of architecture and was designed by Katharine Cotheal Budd, the first woman to be granted membership in the New York chapter of the American Institute of Architects .

Built in 1925, the house was used as an event venue, set location, bed and breakfast and private residence.

Notes

External links

Lake County listings at National Register of Historic Places
Lake County listings at Florida's Office of Cultural and Historical Programs

Houses on the National Register of Historic Places in Florida
National Register of Historic Places in Lake County, Florida
Houses in Lake County, Florida
Houses completed in 1925
1925 establishments in Florida